Delta commonly refers to:
 Delta (letter) (Δ or δ), a letter of the Greek alphabet
 River delta, at a river mouth
 D (NATO phonetic alphabet: "Delta")
 Delta Air Lines, US
 Delta variant of SARS-CoV-2 that causes COVID-19

Delta may also refer to:

Places

Canada
 Delta, British Columbia
 Delta (electoral district), a federal electoral district
 Delta (provincial electoral district)
 Delta, Ontario

United States
 Mississippi Delta
 Delta, Alabama
 Delta Junction, Alaska
 Delta, Colorado
 Delta, Illinois
 Delta, Iowa
 Delta, Kentucky 
 Delta, Louisiana
 Delta, Missouri
 Delta, North Carolina
 Delta, Ohio
 Delta, Pennsylvania
 Sacramento–San Joaquin River Delta,  California
 Delta, Utah
 Delta, Wisconsin, a town
 Delta (community), Wisconsin
 Delta County (disambiguation)

Elsewhere
 Delta Island, Antarctica
 Delta Stream, Antarctica
 Delta, Minas Gerais, Brazil
 Nile Delta, Egypt
 Delta, Thessaloniki, Greece
 Delta State, Nigeria
 Delta, Astrakhan Oblast, Russia
 Colonia Delta, Uruguay

Arts and entertainment

Fictional elements
 Delta Megazord, a Megazord in Power Rangers in Space
 Deltas, a working class in Aldous Huxley's Brave New World

Film and television
 Delta (2008 film), Hungary
 Delta (American TV series), 1992
 Delta (Australian TV series), 1969
 Macross Delta or Macross Δ, in the Macross anime series

Music
 alt-J (∆), British indie band
 Delta blues, a music style
 "Delta", a song by Crosby, Stills & Nash from Daylight Again, 1982

Albums
 Delta (video album), 2003, Delta Goodrem
 Delta (Delta Goodrem album), 2007
 Delta (Visions of Atlantis album), 2011
 Delta (Mumford & Sons album), 2018
 Delta, by Shapeshifter, 2013

Other media
 Delta (magazine), a poetry magazine
 Delta (science magazine)
 Delta (video game), 1987
 Delta FM or Delta Radio, a former UK radio station

Businesses and organizations

Companies
 Delta Air Lines, US
 Delta Connection, a Delta Air Lines brand
 Delta Bank, Ukraine
 Delta Cafés, a Portuguese coffee company 
 Delta Electric Company
 Delta Electricity, Australia
 Delta Electronics, Taiwan
 Delta Faucet Company
 Delta Holding, a Serbian corporation
 Delta Hotels, Canada
 Delta Machinery, a tool company
 Delta Motor Corporation, South Africa
 Former Delta Motors Corporation, Philippines
 DELTA (Dutch cable operator)

Schools
 Delta State (disambiguation), several universities
 Delta College (disambiguation)
 Delta Academy (disambiguation)
 Delta Secondary School (disambiguation)
 Delta High School (disambiguation)
 Delta School District (disambiguation)
 Delta Career Education Corporation, US
 Delta International University of New Orleans, Louisiana, US
 Delta Schools, Riyadh, Saudi Arabia

Law enforcement
 Delta (Norwegian police unit)

Military
 Delta Force, U.S. Army special operations
 Space Force Delta, US Space Force logo
 Delta, a command echelon in the structure of the United States Space Force

Other organizations
 STC Delta, a Georgian R&D center
 American Delta Party, an American political party
 San Francisco Deltas, a soccer team
 Delta Omicron, a music fraternity

Finance
 Delta (finance), rate of change of a value
 Visa Delta or Visa Debit, a  debit card

People
 Δ, signature  of David Macbeth Moir (1798–1851), Scottish physician and writer 
 Delta Burke (born 1956), American actress
 Delta Goodrem (born 1984), Australian singer
 Delta Work, drag queen
 Penelope Delta (1874–1941), Greek author
 Delta (wrestler) (born 1985), Mexican professional wrestler

Science, technology, and mathematics
 The upper- and lower-case Greek letter delta (Δ, δ) are used in many fields to denote a difference in some parameter

Chemistry
 Δ (delta), right-handed isomer in a coordination complex
Delta convention, for designating allenes
 Δ is used to specify certain fatty acids

Computing
 Delta (computer), a Russian ZX Spectrum clone
 Delta encoding or delta compression, in computer communications
 Delta timing, in relation to hardware and network responsiveness
 DELTA, an OpenVMS debugger

Earth sciences
 Epicentral distance (Δ)
 Subtropical Storm Delta (1972), Atlantic 
 Tropical Storm Delta (2005), Atlantic 
 Hurricane Delta (2020), Atlantic

Mathematics
 Δ, a difference of state between two before and after state schemas in the Z notation
 , the first Feigenbaum constant
 Delta connective, a unary connective in t-norm fuzzy logics
 Delta method for approximating the distribution of a function
 Difference operator (Δ)
 Dirac delta function ( function)
 Kronecker delta
 Laplace operator (Δ)
 Modular discriminant (Δ)
 Symmetric difference (Δ)
 Non-inferiority margin (δ)
 Δ, a class of sets in the analytical hierarchy, for every natural number m, n

Medicine and biology
 Delta (ligand), an activator of the notch signaling pathway
 DELTA (taxonomy), a data format for descriptions of living things
 Delta (wasp), Old World genus of potter wasps
 Delta (moth) genus, also Campydelta
Delta variant of SARS-CoV-2 that causes COVID-19
 Delta wave, a brain wave

Vehicles
 Delta (rocket family)
 Delta, a tricycle layout
 Daihatsu Delta, trucks
 Delta formation, V-shaped aircraft formation
 Delta wing, a triangular aircraft wing
 Delta-class submarine (NATO reporting name),  Soviet/Russian SSBN
 GM Delta platform, a car platform
 Lancia Delta, an Italian rally car
 Oldsmobile Delta 88, a GM 1965–1983
 TrikeBuggy Delta, an American ultralight trike

Other uses in science and technology
 Refractory delta, in the roof of an electric arc furnace
 Delta, a quadra group used in socionics
 Delta baryon, a subatomic particle
 Delta circuit, in three-phase electric power
 Delta robot, a delta-shaped parallel robot
 Ilford Delta, a photographic film

Sport
 Delta (horse) (1946–1960), Australia
 Mississippi Valley State Delta Devils and Devilettes, sports teams, Itta Bena, Mississippi, US
 San Francisco Deltas, a soccer team
 Delta (orienteering club), a Finnish former club

Other uses
 Delta Dental, an American system
 Delta Works, a flood-protection works in the Netherlands
 Delta, a font designed by Aldo Novarese
 Diploma in Teaching English to Speakers of Other Languages

See also

 The Delta (disambiguation)
 Delta model, a strategic management model
 Nabla symbol, an inverted delta representing del, a vector differential operator
 Kronecker delta, a function
 Dirac delta, a function

 , represents a triangle defined by points A, B and C
 (ε, δ)-definition of limit
  (%CH), a percentage change operation found on some calculators
 , a classification in the arithmetical hierarchy
 , a classification in the analytical hierarchy
 , a classification in the polynomial hierarchy
 δ13C, a measure of the ratio of stable isotopes 13C:12C
 δ15N, a measure of the ratio of stable isotopes 15N:14N
 δ18O, a measure of the ratio of stable isotopes oxygen-18:oxygen-16
 DeltaWing, a prototype of racing car
 High-leg delta, a three phase electrical circuit
 Delta Delta Delta, a sorority
 Delta function (disambiguation)
 Task Force Delta (disambiguation)
 Delta Force (disambiguation)
 Delta class (disambiguation)
 Delta 1 (disambiguation)
 Delta 4 (disambiguation)
 
 
  and δ
  and δ